Bhisho, alternatively rendered Bisho, is the capital of the Eastern Cape province in South Africa. The Office of the Premier, Provincial Legislature and many other government departments are headquartered in the town. The town, three kilometres from Qonce and 70 kilometres from East London, is also part of Buffalo City.

History
Bhisho derives its name from the Xhosa word for buffalo, which is also the name of the river (Buffalo River) that runs through this town. Bhisho was named after the song by Ben Tyazashe, who wrote of his longing for his home, Bisho, his name for King William's Town however, it has also been claimed that the name was invented by Ciskei leader Lennox Sebe, after his unsuccessful bid to incorporate King William's Town into Ciskei, as Qonce (the Xhosa version of the Khoikhoi name for the Buffalo River; it means “buffalo”) was already used as the native name for King William's Town.

Capital of Ciskei

When the bantustan of Ciskei was nominally granted independence in 1981, although this was never recognised outside South Africa, Bisho served as its capital city. During the early 1980s under the leadership of Lennox Sebe, Bisho underwent a period of intense development.

Its location six kilometres north of King William's Town on the main road linking the Cape to the Transkei and Natal has been described as the result of the Ciskei government wanting to place an "economic stranglehold" upon the white community of King William's Town who united across political lines against incorporation into the homeland, in the face of a 1979 recommendation by the South African government.

In 1983, at the height Ciskei government, Bisho signed a sister-city agreement with the settlement of Ariel in the Israeli-occupied West Bank. This saw the construction of two hospitals (one on a floodplain) including Bisho Hospital and up to 10 firms around the capital by Israeli entrepreneurs and technicians. In 1985, when Bisho ended its relationship with the West Bank, there were 200 Israelis in the Ciskei.

Bisho Massacre

On 7 September 1992, Bisho became the scene of what is known as the Bisho massacre, when about 80–100,000 people marched on Bisho calling for the dismantling of Ciskei, which still maintained a measure of independence, and removal of the homeland's leader Brigadier Oupa Gqozo. The Ciskei Defence Force opened fire, shooting dead 28 or 29 people, and wounding 100. The massacre came at a critical time when negotiations towards democracy were underway.

Post-Apartheid Era
Bisho was reincorporated into South Africa on 12 August 1994, following the first democratic elections in the country in April the same year. In October 1994, the then Eastern Cape Premier Raymond Mhlaba announced that Bisho had been selected as the capital city of the Eastern Cape due to its infrastructure, accessibility to major roads and space for further development.

The department of Arts and Culture published a correction of spelling of Bisho to Bhisho in their government notice No. 830 of Gazette No. 26552 on 16 July 2004.

Bhisho today

Bhisho's major structures include the Eastern Cape government offices (including office of the Premier), a branch of the University of Fort Hare, Bhisho Hospital, Bisho massacre Memorial,  Bhisho Stadium and an SABC radio station known as trufm. Bhisho is dependent on the nearby King Williams Town and East London. The majority of the town's population who are employed are public service workers. 
The town of Bhisho is surrounded by residential areas; Bhisho Central, Tyutyu North, Bhisho Gardens, Balasi and Amatola View.

Climate 
Köppen-Geiger climate classification system classifies Bhisho's climate as cool semi-arid (BSk), although it borders closely on both a hot semi-arid climate (BSh) and a humid subtropical climate (Cfa).

References

Provincial capitals in South Africa
Populated places in Buffalo City Metropolitan Municipality
Capitals of former nations